The Madison Limestone is a thick sequence of mostly carbonate rocks of Mississippian age in the Rocky Mountain and Great Plains areas of the western United States. The rocks serve as an important aquifer as well as an oil reservoir in places. The Madison and its equivalent strata extend from the Black Hills of western South Dakota to western Montana and eastern Idaho, and from the Canada–United States border to western Colorado and the Grand Canyon of Arizona.

Age and nomenclature

The Madison is formally known as the Madison Group. In Montana, where its thickness reaches , the group is subdivided into the Mission Canyon Formation and Lodgepole Formation. Equivalents of the Madison are named the Pahasapa Limestone in the Black Hills, Leadville Limestone (Colorado), Guernsey Limestone (Wyoming), and Redwall Limestone in the Grand Canyon. The upper part of the Madison Group, the Charles Formation in the subsurface of North Dakota and northern Montana, is not strictly an equivalent of the Madison Limestone as usually defined.

Most of the Madison Limestones were deposited during Early to Middle Mississippian time (Tournaisian to Visean stages), about 359 to 326 million years ago. Older North American usage lists the Madison as being laid down during the Kinderhookian, Osagian, and Meramecian stages.

Neither a type locality nor derivation of the name was designated when the term Madison Limestone was first used by Peale (1893), but since the original work focused on the area of Three Forks, Montana, it is likely that the name relates to outcrops along the Madison River, Montana.  A reference section has been designated on the north side of Gibson Reservoir in SE/4 sec. 36, T. 22 N., R. 10 W., Patricks Basin quad, Teton Co., Montana.

Lithology

Limestones and dolomites dominate the Madison. Because the rock is highly soluble, it often develops caves and karst topography. Lewis and Clark Caverns, Montana, is an example of a cave developed in the Madison. The rocks were deposited in a generally shallow marine setting, indicated by the richly fossiliferous rocks of the Madison. In the Williston Basin, water was shallow enough for oolite shoals to develop; they later became reservoirs for oil. 
The gray cliffs along the Missouri River in the Gates of the Mountains, Montana are formed by Madison Limestone.

Subdivisions
Montana-Wyoming-Manitoba
The following formations are recognized in Montana, Wyoming and Manitoba, from top to base:

Saskatchewan
The following subdivisions (of formation rank) are recognized in Saskatchewan, from top to base:

See also
List of types of limestone

References

Geologic groups of the United States
Geologic formations of Saskatchewan
Mississippian Series
Mississippian United States
Carboniferous Arizona
Carboniferous Colorado
Carboniferous Idaho
Carboniferous Montana
Carboniferous North Dakota
Carboniferous geology of South Dakota
Carboniferous Saskatchewan
Carboniferous geology of Utah
Carboniferous geology of Wyoming
Western Canadian Sedimentary Basin
Geologic groups of Idaho
Geologic groups of Colorado
Geologic groups of Arizona
Geologic groups of Montana
Geologic groups of North Dakota
Geologic groups of South Dakota
Geologic groups of Utah
Geologic groups of Wyoming
Stratigraphy of Saskatchewan
Carboniferous System of North America